Wentnor is a civil parish in Shropshire, England.  It contains twelve  listed buildings that are recorded in the National Heritage List for England.  Of these, one is listed at Grade II*, the middle of the three grades, and the others are at Grade II, the lowest grade.  The parish contains the village of Wentnor and smaller settlements, and is otherwise rural.  The listed buildings consist of houses and cottages, farmhouses and farm buildings, a church, a bridge and three milestones.


Key

Buildings

References

Citations

Sources

Lists of buildings and structures in Shropshire